Annaghmore railway station served Annaghmore in County Armagh, Northern Ireland.

History

The station was opened in 1858 by the Portadown, Dungannon and Omagh Junction Railway, which the Great Northern Railway (GNR) took over in 1876. The GNR built a fruit store at the station for the considerable traffic of locally-grown produce, mainly apples and strawberries, that it shipped out of the area by special trains. The Ulster Transport Authority took over the GNR's remaining lines in Northern Ireland in 1958 and closed the PD&O on 15 February 1965.

After the line was closed the former station was sold. For a time it was a car dealership and repair garage and lay derelict for many years until the station was demolished and the site cleared for housing in 2020.

References

 
 

Disused railway stations in County Armagh
Railway stations opened in 1858
Railway stations closed in 1965
Great Northern Railway (Ireland)
Railway stations in Northern Ireland opened in the 19th century